The Michener Award is one of the highest distinctions in Canadian journalism. The award was founded in 1970 by Roland Michener, who was Governor General of Canada at the time, and his wife Norah. The idea for the award was developed in 1969 with Bill MacPherson, then president of the National Press Club and managing editor of the Ottawa Citizen, who remained a secretary of the committee administering the award until his death. Since 1970, the Michener Award has been presented yearly by the Governor General at Rideau Hall to a Canadian news organization "whose entry is judged to have made a significant impact on public policy or on the lives of Canadians".

Although the award is presented to media organizations rather than individual journalists, five individuals of the nominated finalists are invited to the award ceremony so that their contributions can also be acknowledged. Since 1987, the Michener Foundation also awards annually the Michener-Deacon Fellowship, which provides financial support to a journalist wishing to complete a project that serves the Canadian public interest. The fellowship is named in honor of Roland Michener and late journalist Paul Deacon.

Past winners
Where multiple winners are combined in the table below, the winning work was a collaborative joint project of both news organizations. If two distinct pieces simply finished in a tie, then each work is listed on a separate line.

See also
List of awards presented by the Governor General of Canada

References

External links
Home page of the Michener Awards Foundation

1970 establishments in Canada
Canadian journalism awards